General elections were held in the Republic of Serbia on 21 September 1997 to elect the President and National Assembly. With no presidential candidate receiving over 50% of the vote in the first round, a second round was held on 5 October. Running on a platform of Serbian nationalism and neoliberal economic  reforms, Vojislav Šešelj of the Serbian Radical Party received the most votes. However voter turnout was only 48%, below the required 50%. As a result, the elections were annulled, and fresh elections were scheduled for December.

In the National Assembly elections, the Socialist Party of Serbia–Yugoslav Left–New Democracy coalition emerged as the largest in the Assembly, winning 110 of the 250 seats.

The elections were boycotted by several parties, including the Democratic Party, the Democratic Party of Serbia and the Civic Alliance, which claimed that the elections would not be held under fair conditions. Most Kosovo Albanians also boycotted the elections.

Electoral lists 
Following electoral lists are electoral lists that received seats in the National Assembly after the 1997 election:

Results

President (annulled)

National Assembly

See also
 December 1997 Serbian presidential election

References

External links
The Fourth Republican Election (1997) B92

General
Elections in Serbia
Elections in Serbia and Montenegro
General
1997 09
Serbia
Serbia